Anasphaltis renigerellus is a moth of the family Gelechiidae. It is found in France, Germany, Switzerland, Austria, Italy, Poland, the Czech Republic, Slovakia, Slovenia, Croatia, Hungary, Romania, Ukraine and Russia.

The larvae feed on Melittis melissophyllum.

References

Moths described in 1839
Dichomeridinae
Moths of Europe